Douglas Miller may refer to:
Douglas Miller (Alberta politician) (1904–1982), provincial politician from Alberta, Canada
Douglas Miller (musician) (1949–2021), American gospel musician
Douglas Miller (surgeon) (1937–1995) Scottish neurosurgeon
Douglas Miller (swimmer), Fijian swimmer
Doug Miller (musician), in Crazy Town
Doug Miller (soccer) (born 1969), American soccer player and youth coach
Doug Miller (American football) (1969–1998), American football linebacker
Douglas Miller (Indiana politician), American politician of the Indiana House of Representatives
Doug Miller (Texas politician) (born 1954), American politician of the Texas House of Representatives